William Floyd (December 17, 1734 – August 4, 1821) was an American Founding Father, wealthy farmer, and political leader from New York. Floyd served as a delegate to the Continental Congress and was a signer of the Continental Association and Declaration of Independence. In August 1776, a few weeks after the Declaration was signed, the British Army overran Long Island, confiscated Floyd's house and estate, and used the property as a base for its cavalry over the next seven years. Floyd remained active in politics throughout the Revolutionary Era, served as a major general in the New York State militia, and was elected to the first U.S. Congress in 1789.

Early life
Floyd was born on December 17, 1734, in Brookhaven, Province of New York, on Long Island into a family of English and Welsh origins. He was the son of Tabitha (née Smith) Floyd and Nicholl Floyd (1705–1755). Among his siblings was sister Ruth Floyd, who married Brigadier General Nathaniel Woodhull; sister Charity Floyd, who married Continental Congressmen Ezra L'Hommedieu; and brother Charles Floyd, who married Margaret Thomas in 1761.

William's great-grandfather was Richard Floyd, who was born in Brecknockshire, Wales, in about 1620 and was the last of his brothers to leave England, first visiting Jamestown, Virginia, before settling in the Province of New York around 1640 where he practiced law. Around 1688, his grandfather purchased 4,400 acres from Tangier Smith's family in the Mastic Neck of the Town of Brookhaven. William's father Nicoll built a house there in 1723 where William was born.

Career
After his father's death in 1755, William took over the family farm. He became a member of the Suffolk County Militia in the early stages of the American Revolutionary War, becoming Major General. He was a delegate from New York to the Continental Congress from 1774 to 1776. He was a member of the New York State Senate (Southern District) from 1777 to 1788.

On July 4, 1787, he was elected an honorary member of the New York Society of the Cincinnati. In March 1789, he was elected to the 1st United States Congress under the new Constitution as an Anti-Administration candidate and served until March 3, 1791. Floyd was a presidential elector in 1792, voting for George Washington and George Clinton. Floyd, for whom the town of Floyd, New York, is named, became a resident of Oneida County in 1794. 

In 1795, Floyd ran for Lieutenant Governor of New York with Robert Yates on the Democratic-Republican ticket, but they were defeated by Federalists John Jay and Stephen Van Rensselaer. Floyd was again a presidential elector in 1800, voting for Thomas Jefferson and Aaron Burr; and in 1804, voting for Jefferson and George Clinton. Floyd was a member of the state senate (Western District) in 1808.

In 1820, Floyd was chosen a presidential elector but did not attend the meeting of the electoral college, and Martin Van Buren was appointed to fill the vacancy. In the 1820 Census, when Floyd was 86, he had 6 slaves and 2 free black residents lived in his household at the General William Floyd House in Westernville, New York.

Personal life

Family 
The 1760, Floyd was married to Hannah Jones (1740–1781), who was born in Southampton, New York, and was the daughter of William Jones. Together, they were the parents of:

 Nicoll Floyd (1762–1852), who married Phoebe Gelston (1770–1836), daughter of David Gelston (collector of the Port of New York), in 1789.
 Mary Floyd (1764–1805), who married Colonel Benjamin Tallmadge, who was in charge of President George Washington's spy ring.
 Catherine Floyd (1767–1832), who married Reverend William Clarkson (1763–1812).

After the death of his first wife in 1781, Floyd remarried to Joanna Strong (1747–1826), who was born in Setauket, New York, and was the daughter of Benajah Strong and Martha (née Mills) Strong. Together, they were the parents of:

 Ann Floyd (1785–1857), who married George Washington Clinton (1771–1809), son of George Clinton, the first Governor of New York and the fourth Vice President of the United States.
 Elizabeth Floyd (1789–1820), who married James Platt (1788–1870), youngest son of Continental Congressmen Zephaniah Platt.

Residence and estate

The William Floyd House, the family home, is located in Mastic Beach, is part of Fire Island National Seashore and is open to visitors. It consists of the home, grounds and a cemetery of the Floyd family. Over the course of 200 years, eight generations of Floyds have managed the 25-room mansion and 613-acre property. Prior to the 20th century, the estate was much larger.

Descendants
Through his son Nicoll, he was a grandfather of U.S. Representative John Gelston Floyd, and Mary Floyd, who married John Lawrence Ireland (grandson of New York State Senator Jonathan Lawrence). Through his daughter Catherine, he was the grandfather of Harriet Ashton (née Clarkson) Crosby (1786–1859), and great-grandfather of New York State Senator Clarkson Floyd Crosby, who married Angelica Schuyler, daughter of John Schuyler.

Death and legacy
Floyd died on August 4, 1821, and is buried at the Westernville Cemetery in Oneida County. His widow died in 1826.

There are several places named after William Floyd, including:

 William Floyd School District in present-day Brookhaven Town, which includes William Floyd Elementary, William Floyd middle school, and William Floyd High School.
 William Floyd Parkway in the Town of Brookhaven.
 Town of Floyd in Oneida County.
 General William Floyd Elementary School in the Holland Patent School District in Oneida County
 Floyd Memorial Library in Greenport, Suffolk County, New York

See also
 Memorial to the 56 Signers of the Declaration of Independence

Notes

References

External links
 
 
 Floyd Biography by Rev. Charles A. Goodrich, 1856

1734 births
1821 deaths
People from Mastic Beach, New York
People of the Province of New York
Clinton family of New York
American people of Welsh descent
American people of English descent
Presbyterians from New York (state)
Continental Congressmen from New York (state)
Signers of the Continental Association
Signers of the United States Declaration of Independence
Anti-Administration Party members of the United States House of Representatives from New York (state)
1792 United States presidential electors
1800 United States presidential electors
1804 United States presidential electors
New York (state) state senators
American slave owners
People from Westernville, New York
Militia generals in the American Revolution
Founding Fathers of the United States